Alana Newhouse (born 1976) is an American writer and editor. She is the founder of Tablet magazine.

Early life and education
Newhouse was born in 1976 and grew up in Lawrence, New York. Her father came from the Ashkenazic tradition and her mother was Sephardic. She is a graduate of the Hebrew Academy of the Five Towns and Rockaway, a 1997 graduate of Barnard College, and a 2002 graduate of the Columbia University Graduate School of Journalism.

Career
After college, Newhouse worked for political consultant David Garth. Her journalism career began at The Forward, where she was a religion reporter before being named arts and culture editor in 2003. In 2008 she became editor of Nextbook. She established Tablet Magazine for Nextbook in 2009.

Newhouse is a contributor to other media outlets, most notably The New York Times. In April 2010, she reported on a new discovery related to the photography of Roman Vishniac for The New York Times Magazine and, in July 2010, penned a controversial essay on Jewish conversion in Israel for the op-ed page titled "The Diaspora Need Not Apply".

Personal
Newhouse lives in New York City with her husband, David Samuels.

Books
  A living lens: photographs of Jewish life from the pages of the Forward, 2007

References

1976 births
Living people
Barnard College alumni
Columbia University Graduate School of Journalism alumni
People from Lawrence, Nassau County, New York
American magazine editors
Religion journalists
20th-century American Jews
American women non-fiction writers
Women magazine editors
21st-century American Jews
20th-century American women
21st-century American women